The SEAT León Supercopa was a one-make racing series, organised by SEAT Sport, the motorsport division of Spanish car manufacturer SEAT. It used a modified version of the SEAT León road car, and championships have been run in Spain, Germany, Italy, France, the United Kingdom, Turkey and Hungary.

Car
The Supercopa originally used a car based on the Mk1 León Cupra R model. This was replaced for 2006 in Spain and Germany and 2007 in Britain by the Mk2 model.

Championships

Eurocup

The SEAT León Eurocup was first held from 2008 to 2010, supporting the World Touring Car Championship. It was revived in 2014, in this case supporting the International GT Open.

United Kingdom

SEAT introduced the championship to the UK in 2003 under the name SEAT Cupra Championship, as a support series for the British Touring Car Championship, which SEAT Sport UK would go on to enter in 2004. The series was very popular and produced future touring car winners such as Rob Huff, Gordon Shedden and Mat Jackson. The series was ended at the end of 2008 due to SEAT UK's withdrawal from motorsport activities. Plans for an independent Supercopa Challenge to be held in the UK in 2009 were scrapped due to a lack of entries.

Spain

The Supercopa was started by SEAT Sport in Spain in 2002, ahead of the brand's move into the European Touring Car Championship for 2003. Oscar Nouges and Marc Carol have won the most championships in the series, both have driven in WTCC SUNREDs as well as the 2007 champion José Manuel Pérez-Aicart driving in WTCC.

Germany
The German series began in 2004 and was held until 2011. Sebastian Stahl won the first edition, beating Peter Terting, who went on to race in the World Touring Car Championship for SEAT the following year. Nicki Thiim won in 2008 and later became a Porsche factory driver.

Italy
The Trofeo León Supercopa began in 2008 as part of the Campionato Italiano Turismo Endurance series, and is run by SEAT Motorsport Italia.

France
The French Supercopa was run from 2010 to 2012, organised by Oreca as part of the GT Tour, supporting the FFSA GT Championship.

Mexico

Hungary
The Hungarian Seat Leon Supercopa started in 2007.

Champions

External links
 León Supercopa at SEAT Sport
  SEAT Deutschland 
  SEAT Motorsport Italia 
  SEAT Supercopa France 
  SEAT León Eurocup

Touring car racing series
SEAT
One-make series